Quesnelia is a genus of plants in the family Bromeliaceae, subfamily Bromelioideae. The genus is named after French businessman and patron of botany Edouard Prosper Quesnel, of Le Havre (1781-1850). Endemic to eastern Brazil, this genus contains 22 known species. This genus has two recognized subgenera: the type subgenus and Billbergiopsis Mez.

Species
, Plants of the World Online accepted 24 species:

References

External links

FCBS Quesnelia Photos
BSI Genera Gallery photos

 
Bromeliaceae genera
Endemic flora of Brazil
Flora of the Atlantic Forest
Taxa named by Charles Gaudichaud-Beaupré